Pseudoliparis is a genus of snailfishes native to very deep water in the northwestern Pacific Ocean.

Species
There are currently three recognized species in this genus:

 Pseudoliparis amblystomopsis (Andriashev, 1955)
 Pseudoliparis belyaevi Andriashev & Pitruk, 1993
 Pseudoliparis swirei Gerringer & Linley, 2017

References

Liparidae
Taxa named by Anatoly Andriyashev